= Australia national field hockey team =

Australia national field hockey team may refer to:

- Australia men's national field hockey team
- Australia women's national field hockey team
